Itamos is a former municipality in the Karditsa regional unit, Thessaly, Greece. Since the 2011 local government reform it is part of the municipality Karditsa, of which it is a municipal unit. The municipal unit has an area of 234.384 km2. Population 2,657 (2011). The seat of the municipality was in Kallithiro.

References

Populated places in Karditsa (regional unit)